Piesseville is a small town in the Wheatbelt region of Western Australia,  south-east of Perth on the Great Southern Highway between Narrogin and Wagin. It is also on the Great Southern Railway.

History
In the 1860s, early settlers came to the area to graze their flocks, but the first official records of it began in 1889 when the Great Southern Railway opened, and a siding called Buchanan River was opened. In 1897, the Government set aside land for subdivision here, and in 1903 lots were surveyed and the town of Buchanan gazetted. The land agent at Katanning reported considerable interest, and a hall, school and other facilities had been completed by 1904.

However, the name clashed with a town in New South Wales (now little more than a historic gallery outside Kurri Kurri in the Hunter Region), so the town was renamed Barton in 1905 to honour Australia's first prime minister (1901–1903), Sir Edmund Barton. However, after the construction of the Trans-Australian Railway in 1917, another railway station named after Barton in the South Australian stretch of the Nullarbor Plain led to another name change – this time to Piesse, after two prominent residents Frederick Henry Piesse and Charles Austin Piesse, in December 1918. Five years later, the town was changed to its present name – its fourth in 20 years.

Piesseville today is more of an agricultural locality, although the original 1904 hall still stands.

References

Towns in Western Australia
Wheatbelt (Western Australia)